John Merle Coulter, Ph. D. (November 20, 1851 – December 23, 1928) was an American botanist and educator. In his career in education administration, Coulter is notable for serving as the president of Indiana University and Lake Forest College and the head of the Department of Botany at the University of Chicago.

Early life and education
John Merle Coulter was born in Ningpo, China to missionary parents Caroline Elvira Crowe and Moses Stanley Coulter. His brother was the botanist Stanley Coulter.  He graduated from Hanover College in Indiana receiving the degree A.B. in 1870, followed by an A.M. in 1873 and Ph.D. in 1883 from the Indiana University. Indiana University conferred a pro merito Ph.D. to Coulter in 1884 while he was serving as Professor of Botany at Wabash College. He married Georgie M. Gaylord of Delphi, Indiana on January 1, 1874.

Career
John Merle Coulter held the following positions:
 1871–1879 Professor of Natural Sciences at Hanover College
 1872–1875 Botanist to the United States Geological Survey in the Rocky Mountains
 1879–1891 Professor of Botany at Wabash College
 1891–1893 President and Professor of Botany of Indiana University, succeeding David Starr Jordan as president
 1893–1896 President of Lake Forest College
 1896–1925 Professor and head of the department of Botany at the University of Chicago.
 1925–1928 Dean and adviser of the Boyce Thompson Institute for Plant Research in Yonkers, New York, a position he held until his death.

Memberships in scientific societies
In 1901, Coulter was the general secretary of the American Association for the Advancement of Science and in 1918 served as the Association's president. From 1897 to 1898, he was the president of the Botanical Society of America.

Survival of the sinking of Republic
In 1909, Coulter and his wife, along with their children Grace and Merle, survived the sinking of the White Star liner  in which six were killed.

Later life
While employed at the Boyce Thompson Institute, Coulter died from heart disease at his home in Yonkers, New York, on December 23, 1928 at the age of 77.

Notable works

John Merle Coulter's published works include:
 Synopsis of the Flora of Colorado (1874), with Thomas Porter and Ferdinand Vandeveer Hayden
 Manual of Rocky Mountain Botany (1885; revised, 1909)
 Manual of Texan Botany (1892–93)
 Plant Relations (1899; third revision, 1910)
 Plant Structures (1899; second edition, 1904)
 Morphology of Spermatophytes (1901)
 Morphology of Angiosperms (1903), with C. J. Chamberlain
 Plant Studies (1902; revised 1905)
 A Text-Book of Botany for Colleges and Universities(two volumes, 1910–11)
 Elementary Studies in Botany (1913)
 Plant Breeding (1914)
 Evolution, Heredity and Eugenics (1916)
 Religion and Science (1923)

In 1875, Coulter founded the Botanical Gazette and thereafter continued to be its editor.

Legacy and contributions

As president of Indiana University

Coulter's student, Henry Chandler Cowles played a significant role in documenting the ecological importance of the Indiana Dunes.  Many conservationists attempted to preserve parts of the Indiana Dunes.

References

External links
 IMA
 Living Rocks of New Mexico
 
 
 Indiana University President's Office records, 1891–1893
 National Academy of Sciences Biographical Memoir
 Guide to the John Merle Coulter Papers 1845-1929 at the University of Chicago Special Collections Research Center

American taxonomists
1851 births
1928 deaths
American botanical writers
Presidents of Indiana University
Presidents of the American Association of University Professors
University of Chicago faculty
University of Chicago staff
Hanover College alumni
Botanical Society of America
Educators from Indiana
Educators from Ningbo
Writers from Ningbo
19th-century American botanists
20th-century American botanists
19th-century American writers
20th-century American non-fiction writers
20th-century American male writers
American male non-fiction writers